The New Zealand Medical Association (NZMA) is an association representing some doctors and medical students in New Zealand. It was officially founded after a meeting in April 1886 at Dunedin Hospital. From 1896 to 1967, the NZMA was considered as a branch of the British Medical Association and was known as the New Zealand Branch of the British Medical Association well into the 1970s.  In the 1960s, Erich Geiringer, who was in conflict with the association, exploited the potential for confusion by founding the New Zealand Medical Association (since this name was officially free). Geiringer's NZMA included a number of progressive physicians and was very involved in political debates.

The NZMA is part of the World Medical Association and publishes The New Zealand Medical Journal.

In May 2022, the Board of the NZMA recommended to members that at a meeting on 30 May 2022, they should vote to liquidate the association, because of long-standing financial difficulties caused by falling support. On 30 May the members voted to liquidate.

See also
List of New Zealand doctors
Health care in New Zealand

References

External links 
 

 
Medical associations based in New Zealand
1886 establishments in New Zealand
Organisations based in New Zealand with royal patronage